Dessau Institute of Architecture (DIA) is a graduate unit within the Faculty of Architecture and Building Engineering in Anhalt University of Applied Sciences (Hochschule Anhalt) in Dessau, Germany. The institute runs a four semester professional master's program in architecture, which is taught in English. The institute is located partly within the historic Bauhaus building designed by Walter Gropius. DIA's students come from more than thirty different countries, making it one of the most international schools in Europe. The institute was run by Alfred Jacoby until 2017. The current director is Prof. Ralf Niebergall.

Teachers 2020
Faculty Staff

Prof. Ralf Niebergall – DIA Director

Prof. Johannes Kalvelage
Prof. Johannes Kister 
Prof. dott. arch. Christoph Kohl (Substitute Professor) 
Prof. Dr. Natascha Meuser [www.nataschameuser.com]
Prof. Dr. Stefan Reich. 
Prof. Stefan Worbes
Prof. Dr. Gernot Weckherlin (Substitute Professor)
Juanfra Garcia Guillen

Guests Studio Masters
Peter Apel  
Clément Blanchet 
Roger Bundschuh  
Ivan Kucina
Johanna Meyer-Grohbrügge 
Dr. Sina Mostafavi  
Amelie Rost  
Prof. Peter Ruge  
Fredrik Skåtar  

Electives/CAD-Logic
Torsten Blume
Marco Mondello
Esteban Lamm
Alexander Lech  
Prof. Dieter Raffler
Nico Steinborn
Fredrik Skåtar  
Ines Toscano  

Some of the visiting professors were:
Gabriel Feld (RISD)
Roger Bundschuh (Bundschuh Architekten) 
Neil Leach (USC)
Lara Schrijver (TU Delft)
Arie Graafland (TU Delft)
Max Cohen de Lara and David Mulder (XML Architecture Research Urbanism) 
Jasper de Haan (Jasper de Haan Architecten)
Joris Fach (Department of Architecture, University of Cambridge)
Mathias del Campo (SPAN architects)
Lars Lerup (Rice University)
Christos Passas (Zaha Hadid Architects)
Daniel Dendra (Another Architect)
Immanuel Koh
Andong Lu (Department of Architecture, University of Cambridge)
Senan Abdelqader (Senan Abdelqader Architects)

External links
 Official website

Architecture schools in Germany
Dessau